Ravang (also Romanized as Ravank) is a village in Golmakan Rural District, Golbajar District, Chenaran County, Razavi Khorasan Province, Iran. At the 2006 census, its population was 26, in 5 families.

References 

Populated places in Chenaran County